Tristan Jepson (1978 – 28 October 2004) was an Australian law graduate and writer.

Biography
Jepson was educated at Trinity Grammar School and the University of New South Wales. While still an undergraduate law student, he began to write and perform comedy as director of the University of New South Wales' Law Revue. On graduation in 2003, he joined the cast of the AFI Award nominated sketch comedy TV programme Big Bite, where he was perhaps best known for impersonations of Tom Gleisner in parody sketches of The Panel.

Diagnosed with clinical depression in 1998, Jepson suffered bouts during his university years and committed suicide by drug overdose, aged 26.

The Tristan Jepson Memorial Foundation, named in his honor, is an organisation which works to foreground issues of mental illness in the law, including law students, graduates, practicing lawyers, and judges. The foundation changed its name to Minds Count in 2018.

In 2006 the University of New South Wales inaugurated an annual Tristan Jepson Memorial Lecture.

References

External links
 
 Sydney Morning Herald Article About Tristan Jepson
 The Tristan Jepson Memorial Fund
 Article about Tristan Jepson Memorial Lecture

1978 births
2004 deaths
People from Sydney
Australian male television actors
Australian television writers
University of New South Wales Law School alumni
People educated at Trinity Grammar School (New South Wales)
Australian male television writers
20th-century Australian screenwriters